The director of the National Institutes of Health (NIH) plays an active role in shaping the agency's activities and outlook. The director is responsible for providing leadership to the institutes and for constantly identifying needs and opportunities, especially for efforts that involve multiple institutes. The NIH director is responsible for advising the U.S. president on their annual budget request to Congress on the basis of extensive discussions with the institute directors.

History
The position of the NIH Director became presidentially appointed with the passage of the National Cancer Act of 1971 and Senate confirmed with the National Cancer Act Amendments of 1974.  Prior to 1971, all NIH Directors were appointed by the Surgeon General, with the exception of Robert Q. Marston, who was appointed by the Secretary of Health, Education, and Welfare. Acting Directors are selected by the Secretary of Health and Human Services and hold the position until the President nominates a new director who is confirmed by the Senate.

List of directors 
Unnumbered, colored rows indicate acting directors.

Previous directors

References

Citations

Bibliography

Directors of the National Institutes of Health